Luca Santolini (born 22 February 1985) is a Sammarinese politician and one of the Captains Regent, who served with Mirko Tomassoni from 1 October 2018 until 1 April 2019.

Life
He in serving as a member of the Grand and General Council since 2012. Santolini graduated in international relations from the University of Bologna and in journalism from the University of Urbino.

References

1985 births
Living people
People from Borgo Maggiore
University of Bologna alumni
University of Urbino alumni
Captains Regent of San Marino
Members of the Grand and General Council
Civic 10 politicians